Cyril Beverly "Cy" Sherwood (July 1, 1915 – December 10, 1996) was a farmer and political figure in New Brunswick, Canada. He represented King's County in the Legislative Assembly of New Brunswick as a Progressive Conservative member from 1952 to 1967. He was named to the Senate of Canada for Royal division in 1979 and served until 1990.

He was born in Midland, New Brunswick, the son of Richard M. Sherwood and Edna Gillies. He was educated at the University of New Brunswick. He raised dairy cattle and was also a fox rancher. In 1939, he married Madelene Lunn. Sherwood was Minister of Agriculture in the province's Executive Council from 1952 to 1960. He helped establish the New Brunswick Cream Producers' Marketing Board and the New Brunswick Milk Producers' Association and introduced legislation that led to the creation of the New Brunswick Milk Marketing Board.

References 
 Canadian Parliamentary Guide, 1956, PG Normandin
 
 

1915 births
1996 deaths
Progressive Conservative Party of New Brunswick MLAs
Members of the Executive Council of New Brunswick
Canadian senators from New Brunswick
New Brunswick political party leaders
Progressive Conservative Party of Canada senators